Cranny is a small village in County Clare, Ireland.

Location
Cranny lies on the banks of the Cloon River, which flows into the estuary of the River Shannon at Clonderlaw Bay.

Facilities
There is a local Gaelic Athletic Association club, Coolmeen GAA, founded in 1887 three years after the association came together. Coolmeen GAA succeeded in the Clare Senior Football Championship in 1919 and 1921, in the Clare Intermediate Football Championship in 1959, 1966 and 1967 and in the Clare Junior A Football Championship in 1958, 1964, 1983 and 1999. The parish also has a national school. The Cranny N.S. is a co-educational catholic primary school.

Notable people
 Peadar Clancy, Irish republican

See also
 List of towns and villages in Ireland

References

Towns and villages in County Clare